Coffee Talk is a visual novel developed by Indonesian indie studio Toge Productions, and released on 29 January 2020 for Microsoft Windows, macOS, Nintendo Switch, PlayStation 4, and Xbox One. The game was released in Japan for Nintendo Switch a day later on 30 January 2020. The game follows a barista working in a coffee shop in a fantasy version of Seattle as they listen to the concerns of the coffee shop's various patrons and prepare drinks. The game features an aesthetic inspired by 90s anime, pixel art, and the lo-fi chillhop genre of music.

A sequel, Coffee Talk Episode 2: Hibiscus & Butterfly, is planned for release in 2023.

Plot 
The game follows a barista who is the owner and sole employee of Coffee Talk, the eponymous coffee shop, which is located in Seattle, Washington, in a fantasy version of the real world populated by a broad variety of fantasy races, such as elves, orcs, mermaids, and others. Various members of these races serve as the shop's patrons. The game's plot is experienced over the course of two weeks, with each day acting as a vignette in which various characters visit the coffee shop and discuss their concerns with the barista and with each other. The game's characters include Freya, a fairy woman and a journalist for the fictional newspaper The Evening Whispers and an aspiring fiction writer; Jorji, a local cop who visits the coffee shop regularly; Rachel, a former member of a girl band who is trying to start a career as a solo musician; Hendry, Rachel's father and former big name in music industry who wants to protect his daughter; Neil, an alien visiting Earth with the mission of breeding with its inhabitants; Hyde, an immortal vampire who works as a model and former employer of; Gala, werewolf and veteran who worked as a body guard for Hyde and now tries to heal himself by healing others; Myrtle, an orc working on the fictional game "Full Metal Panic" and very work oriented; Aqua, an octopus girl who is extremely shy but extremely passionate about advancing technology, indie game developer, loves of the "Full Metal Panic" series; and a young couple consisting of Lua, a succubus, and Baileys, an elf, whose families do not approve of their relationship due to their racial differences.

Gameplay 
Coffee Talk is a visual novel, and as such, its gameplay consists mostly of reading dialogue. This dialogue is periodically broken up by a minigame in which the player brews various drinks using the ingredients in the coffee shop. Certain drinks give the player the option to create latte art. The drinks made by the player can have an effect on the events of the game's plot, and thus this minigame serves as the chief means of interaction with the game available to the player. The player character can access their smartphone at any time in order to view the social media profiles of the game's characters, reference a list of known drink recipes, read short fiction published in the game's fictional newspaper, and change what song is playing.

Development
Coffee Talk was developed by Toge Productions. According to Lasheli Dwitri, the person in charge of public relations at the indie studio, the goal with Coffee Talk was to create a medium where people can just be comfortable and feel warm, like sitting in a cozy café while sipping a cup of coffee.

A Japanese TV show titled Midnight Diner served as the biggest influence for Coffee Talk. The story of Midnight Diner revolves around a chef in a restaurant that only opens at midnight, and his involvement in the customers’ lives.

To create a 'sense of belonging' with players from all over the world, the game features various real-life drinks, such as masala chai from India, teh tarik from Malaysia, and shai Adeni from Yemen. In Coffee Talk, alongside humans, fantasy races such as elves, succubi, orcs, vampires and werewolves exist. One of the reasons they were added was to represent real life experiences. Despite being fantasy characters, the studio tried to make the conflicts in the game as realistic as possible.

Mohammad Fahmi, the main creator and developer of Coffee Talk, died in March 2022.

Critical reception 

Coffee Talk received "mixed or average" and "generally positive" reviews, according to review aggregator Metacritic.

Writing for Game Informer, Kimberley Wallace gave the game a positive review, calling the game "an interesting experience" while stating that some topics in the game could have been explored more. She also praised the characters in the game. Chris Moyse of Destructoid gave Coffee Talk a mixed review, saying that the game "is very much a mismatched brew", mentioning the lack of focus as a negative aspect of the game. He continues with stating that the game's "casual philosophies can sometimes be hard to swallow, [but] great visuals, fun side modes, and a budget price point suggests that, for some readers, Coffee Talk will still go down smooth".

Sequel
A sequel, Coffee Talk Episode 2: Hibiscus & Butterfly, was announced on 31 August 2021. It is planned to be released in 2023 for Microsoft Windows, Nintendo Switch, PlayStation 4, and Xbox One. A demo was released on 17 January 2022.

Notes

References

External links 

2020 video games
Business simulation games
Chorus Worldwide games
Indie video games
MacOS games
Nintendo Switch games
PlayStation 4 games
Retro-style video games
Single-player video games
Toge Productions games
Urban fantasy video games
Video games about food and drink
Video games developed in Indonesia
Video games set in Seattle
Visual novels
Windows games
Xbox One games